Notoscincus butleri, also known commonly as Butler's snake-eyed skink, the lined soil-crevice skink, and the lined soil-crevis skink,  is a species of lizard in the family Scincidae. The species is endemic to Australia.

Etymology
The specific name, butleri, is in honor of Australian naturalist William Henry "Harry" Butler.

Geographic range
N. butleri is found in the Pilbara region in the Australian state of Western Australia.

Habitat
The preferred natural habitat of N. butleri is stony grassland.

Reproduction
N. butleri is oviparous.

References

Further reading
Cogger HG (2014). Reptiles and Amphibians of Australia, Seventh Edition. Clayton, Victoria, Australia: CSIRO Publishing. xxx + 1,033 pp. .
Storr GM (1979). "Five new lizards from Western Australia". Records of the Western Australian Museum 8 (1): 134–142. (Notoscincus butleri, new species, pp. 140–142, Figure 4).
Wilson S, Swan G (2013). A Complete Guide to Reptiles of Australia, Fourth Edition. Sydney: New Holland Publishers. 522 pp. .

Notoscincus
Reptiles described in 1979
Taxa named by Glen Milton Storr